was the ninth Abe daimyō of Oshi Domain in Musashi Province (modern-day Saitama Prefecture) and the first Abe daimyō of Shirakawa Domain in southern Mutsu Province (modern Fukushima Prefecture).

Masanori was born as the second son of Abe Masayoshi,  daimyō of Oshi Domain.  His childhood name was Kanemaru (銕 丸). When he was three years old, his father died and Masanori became heir and chieftain of his branch of the Abe clan. However, since Masanori was under age and also of feeble constitution, his mother took over the administration of the domain and Masanori was placed under the guardianship of Abe Masakiyo, daimyō of Fukuyama Domain in Bingo Province.

In 1822, the Tokugawa shogunate issued a decree rotating the daimyō of Oshi, Kuwana and Shirakawa Domains. The Abe clan, which had been administering Oshi for 114 years, was forced to relocate to Shirakawa. In the midst of this move, Masanori died. Since he died, without having ever been formally received in audience by the Shōgun, he was never awarded a formal court rank or courtesy title. The succession passed to his cousin Abe Masaatsu.

References 

Fudai daimyo
Abe clan
1806 births
1823 deaths